Stephanie M. Wytovich (born c. 1989) is an American editor, novelist and poet working in the horror genre.

Stephanie M. Wytovich is from Pittsburgh, Pennsylvania. She graduated from Seton Hill University initially with her BA in English literature and art history before also completing an MFA in writing popular fiction. Wytovich works at Western Connecticut State University, Point Park University and Southern New Hampshire University. Wytovich also works as a book reviewer for Nameless Magazine and as poetry editor for Raw Dog Screaming Press. She writes horror novels and poetry and has been published in a number of magazines including Pedestal magazine and The Horror Zine. Her work has been collected in a number of books. She is a member of the Science Fiction Poetry Association and the Horror Writers Association.

Wytovich won the 2017 Bram Stoker Award for her collection Brothel. Her work has been nominated almost every year since 2014. In 2017 Wytovich won the Rocky Wood Memorial Scholarship for Non-Fiction.

Bibliography

Novels 
The Eighth (2016) –

Collections 
Hysteria: A Collection of Madness (2013) – 
Mourning Jewelry (2014) – 
An Exorcism of Angels (2015) – 
Brothel (2016) – 
Sheet Music to My Acoustic Nightmare (2017) – 
The Apocalyptic Mannequin (2019) –

Anthologies, as editor

HWA Poetry Showcase 
Poetry Showcase: Volume V (2018)
Poetry Showcase: Volume VI (2019)
Poetry Showcase: Volume VII (2020)
Poetry Showcase: Volume VIII (2021)

Anthologies, as contributor 
The Best Horror of the Year: Volume 8 (2016)
"The 21st Century Shadow" (poem)
Year's Best Hardcore Horror: Volume 2 (2017)
Select poems from Brothel
"On This Side of Bloodletting" (short fiction)
Fantastic Tales of Terror (2018)
"The Girl with the Death Mask" (short fiction)
Tales from the Lake: Volume 5 (2018)
"From the Mouths of Plague-Mongers" (poem)
"The Monster Told Me To" (short fiction)
Miscreations: Gods, Monstrosities & Other Horrors (2020)
"A Benediction of Corpses" (short fiction)
Attack from the '80s (2021)
"Mother Knows Best" (short fiction)

Short fiction 

 "Vines Are in Her Wardrobe" (2015)
 "On This Side of Bloodletting" (2016)
 "The Girl with the Death Mask" (2018)
 "The Monster Told Me To" (2018)
 "A Benediction of Corpses" (2020)
 "Mother Knows Best" (2021)

Awards

Literary awards

Other honors 

 Horror Writers Association Rocky Wood Memorial Scholarship for Non-Fiction (2017) (co-winner)

References and sources

1980s births
Seton Hill University alumni
Living people
American horror writers
Writers from Pittsburgh
American women short story writers
21st-century American women